The Kochubey House or the Judge General Vasyl Kochubey House is a museum of the National Historical and Cultural Reserve “Hetman's Capital” in Baturyn in Chernihiv Oblast, Ukraine.

Architecture of the house
The building was erected in the second half of the 17th century, in the style of Ukrainian (Cossack) Baroque. The brick house is one story, and has a basement. Its current appearance is not original, instead having rebuilt elements. What has survived to the present day is a prominent example of Ukrainian architecture of the second half of the 17th century. The house serves as an administrative-residential building for Judge General Vasyl Kochubey.

History of the house

The Kochubeys owned the house until 1917.

In 1925, on the initiative of the Society of Beekeepers, a museum of beekeeping named after Peter Prokopovich was opened in the building.

During the Great Patriotic War, the architectural monument was severely damaged, with only the original walls remaining. Restoration of the house began in the early 1970s. In 1975 a museum of local lore was opened in the building.

In 1993, on the basis of the Baturyn Museum of History and Local Lore, the Baturyn State Historical and Cultural Reserve “Hetman's Capital” was established. Large-scale restoration of V. Kochubey's house took place in 2003-2005, and a new museum exhibition was later opened in 2007.

Museum exhibition

The museum exhibition is located in four halls and the basement of the house.

The exhibition of the first hall reviews the history of the house's construction, restoration and use over time. A family tree and family portraits show the history of the Kochubey family.

A separate display is dedicated to Samiylo Wielyczko, author of the Cossack Chronicle.

A separate hall is dedicated to the theme of love between Motri Kochubey and Hetman Ivan Mazepa, in which the letters of Hetman Mazepa to Motrona occupy a central place. Displayed is the icon of the Mother of God, donated in 1707 by Hetman Ivan Mazepa to the church of the city of Zhovkva in the Lviv region.

The works of artists dedicated to the history of Great Love are presented. The fourth exhibition hall reviews the life of the last owner of the Kochubey estate, Vasyl Petrovych Kochubey, and the history of the Kochubey family. The exhibition presents original Kochubey furniture and documents.

The basement of the house has not been rebuilt in several centuries. The interior of the prison is recreated with wax figures of a court clerk and a prisoner, instruments of torture and images of Cossack punishments.

Gallery

See also
Kochubey family
Kochubeyevsky Park

References

External links 
 Virtual tour of the museum
 The site of the reserve

History museums in Ukraine
Tourist attractions in Chernihiv Oblast
Baturyn
Buildings and structures in Chernihiv Oblast